Wa Na Mumuni Koray was the ruler of Wa, in modern-day Ghana. He succeeded Wa Na Pelepuo in November 1949 and died four years later in 1953.

References

Ghanaian royalty
1953 deaths
Ghanaian Ahmadis
People from Upper West Region
20th-century rulers in Africa